Spun is a 2002 American black comedy crime drama film directed by Jonas Åkerlund from an original screenplay by William De Los Santos and Creighton Vero, based on three days of De Los Santos's life in the Eugene, Oregon, drug subculture. The film stars Jason Schwartzman, John Leguizamo, Mena Suvari, Patrick Fugit, Peter Stormare, Alexis Arquette, Deborah Harry, Rob Halford, Eric Roberts, Chloe Hunter, Nicholas Gonzalez, Brittany Murphy and Mickey Rourke.

Åkerlund made his debut as a feature film director with Spun, having already become known for his work in music videos. The film was shot in 22 days, and centers on various people involved in a methamphetamine drug ring. The film blends elements of dark comedy and drama in its storytelling. Its title is a reference to the slang term for the way users feel after going multiple days without sleep while on a methamphetamine binge. The characters take a combined total of 23 "hits" during the course of the movie.

Plot
Ross (Jason Schwartzman) is a customer of Spider Mike (John Leguizamo), a methamphetamine dealer. Spider Mike and his girlfriend Cookie (Mena Suvari) are constantly arguing, and Ross strikes up a friendship with Nikki (Brittany Murphy), a fellow addict. Nikki takes Ross to meet her boyfriend, "The Cook" (Mickey Rourke), who supplies Spider Mike with drugs from a meth lab he has set up in a motel room. The Cook gives a small amount of meth to Ross in exchange for bringing Nikki home, and says that he will get in touch with Ross if he needs a driver.

Back at his apartment, Ross gets messages from his mother and his former girlfriend, Amy, wishing him a happy birthday. Ross, assuming that Amy still loves him, sporadically calls her and leaves messages on her answering machine. He then goes to the local strip club while high, leading to an intense pornographic hallucination. He takes April (Chloe Hunter), one of the dancers he has a relationship with, home and has sex with her in a variety of positions, the last of which leaves her tied to the bed, naked and fully spread. As they finish, the Cook calls with an emergency regarding Nikki's dog, Taco, which needs to be taken to the veterinarian. April tells him to untie her but Ross, still high, duct-tapes April's eyes and mouth shut to keep her quiet and leaves her bound to the bed, playing music to cover her gagged screams. Elsewhere, two policemen (Peter Stormare and Alexis Arquette) working with a TV crew, raid the trailer where Frisbee (Patrick Fugit), another one of Spider Mike's customers, lives, falsely believing that a meth lab is located there. They take Frisbee and his overweight mother into custody and threaten him into helping them on a drug bust against Spider Mike.

After driving the Cook around town to buy ephedrine pills, beer, and pornography, Ross returns to his apartment to apologize to the helpless April. In the Cook's motel room, he and Nikki have a fight after a prostitute arrives in response to the Cook's inviting her around. Nikki ends their relationship, and calls Ross and asks him to take her to a bus station so she can go back to Las Vegas, which Ross does, again leaving April still tied to the bed. While Ross and Nikki are out, Frisbee, now wearing a wire, visits Spider Mike to buy some meth so the cops can arrest him. When he enters, Cookie attempts to seduce him, as revenge for Spider Mike using a phone sex line, but finds the wire. As the cops burst in, a furious Spider Mike shoots Frisbee in the testicles; Spider Mike and Cookie are both arrested, and Frisbee is taken to the hospital. After Ross and Nikki go back to his apartment and find April gone (rescued by his lesbian neighbor (Deborah Harry)), Ross finally drops Nikki off at the bus station, where they share a kiss, and hope to reunite if he ever goes to Vegas.

Meanwhile, the Cook's meth lab catches fire and destroys the motel room; he flees to the adult film store, where he is arrested after the owner (Rob Halford) calls the police. Once the Cook makes bail, he calls Ross asking for a ride to another dealer's (Eric Roberts) house in the city, which Ross agrees to do so that he can see Amy, who also lives in the city. The dealer provides the Cook with cash, some meth, and the equipment to start a new lab. The Cook promises Ross six months' worth of meth in exchange for being his chauffeur; he agrees on the condition that he can see Amy first. Amy, who has gotten her life together, wants no part of him after seeing that he still uses drugs and can only give her $100 of the $450 he owes her. As all the other characters go to sleep, the Cook drives a depressed Ross out to an old trailer in the countryside. Ross naps in his car as the Cook sets up a new lab in the trailer, only to blow it and himself up in the process.

Cast
 Jason Schwartzman as Ross
 Mickey Rourke as The Cook
 Brittany Murphy as Nikki
 John Leguizamo as Spider Mike
 Mena Suvari as Cookie
 Patrick Fugit as Frisbee
 Peter Stormare as Mullet Cop
 Alexis Arquette as Moustache Cop
 Deborah Harry as The Neighbor
 Eric Roberts as The Man
 Chloe Hunter as April
 Nicholas Gonzalez as Angel
 Charlotte Ayanna as Amy

Cameos
 Larry Drake as Dr. K.
 Billy Corgan as The Doctor
 China Chow as The Prostitute
 Rob Halford as The Clerk
 Tony Kaye as The Strip Club Announcer
 Ron Jeremy as The Bartender
 Josh Peck as Fat Boy

Reception
The film received mixed reactions, with some analysts remarking that the film added nothing new to the genre of drug movies. , the film holds a 37% approval rating on Rotten Tomatoes, based on 79 reviews with an average rating of 4.7/10. The website's critics consensus reads: "A chaotic drug movie that has little substance behind the stylistic flash." Time Out London was particularly harsh, accusing the film of "smug amoralism", and claiming that Åkerlund simply re-uses other people's ideas and techniques.

Roger Ebert was more sympathetic in his review, where he described the film as having "effortless wickedness". His main appraisal is the fact that the film in no way attempts to romanticize any of the characters and further goes on to say, "it's interesting how this story and these people seem to have been living before the movie began and will continue after it is over; instead of a plot, we drop in on their lives". Ebert does, however, explicitly mention the similarities between this and the earlier Requiem for a Dream. This comparison may not have been lost on the filmmakers. The title on a pornographic tape purchased by a character reads "Rectum for a Dream", and the scenes which show consumption of the drug also show its dilating effect on the pupils in fast cutscenes.

Soundtrack
The original music for Spun was written by Billy Corgan. The soundtrack to the film features songs by artists such as Iron Maiden and UFO (performed by The Djali Zwan), Ozzy Osbourne, Mötley Crüe, Blues Traveler, Bathory (for whom Åkerlund once briefly played drums), Richie Havens, Phantom Planet (with whom Jason Schwartzman played drums at the time), Per Gessle (half of Roxette), Paola, and Satyricon, whose video for the song "Mother North" appears in the movie.

References

External links
 
 
 
 
 Metroactive Movie Review
 Film Freak Movie Review

2002 films
2000s crime comedy-drama films
American crime comedy-drama films
Films directed by Jonas Åkerlund
Films about drugs
American independent films
Newmarket Capital Group films
Films scored by Billy Corgan
2002 directorial debut films
2002 independent films
2000s English-language films
2000s American films